On 24 February 2023, three days after she was reported missing, 28-year-old Hong Kong model, socialite and Internet celebrity Abby Choi was found murdered, with her headless body discovered at a village in Tai Po, a suburb in Hong Kong. Reportedly, some of her body parts were hidden inside a refrigerator and some of them were cooked.

According to the police, a total of seven suspects have been arrested so far for the murder of Choi, consisting of her former husband, her former parents-in-law, her former brother-in-law, the alleged mistress of her former father-in-law, and two others. Investigations are currently ongoing.

Discovery of Choi's death
On 24 February 2023, three days after her disappearance, the headless corpse of 28-year-old Abby Choi was discovered at a Tai Po village house in Hong Kong. Reportedly, some of her body parts were hidden inside a refrigerator and some of them were cooked. The police therefore classified the case as murder. Choi was reported missing after she failed to pick up her daughter from school as she normally did and she last entered the car driven by her hired driver, who is also her ex-brother-in-law. A meat slicer and electric saw were also found at the scene, according to police statements to the press.

According to news reports, Choi first debuted as an influencer before she subsequently expanded her career into mainstream media. She was known as a fashion icon who could mix and match pieces in ways that made her a trendsetter, and she had more than 100,000 followers on Instagram. She also regularly attended the Paris Fashion Week and had been featured in several magazines including Elle, Harper’s Bazaar and Vogue. Less than two weeks before her death, Choi was featured on the cover of fashion and luxury lifestyle magazine L’Officiel Monaco.

As the eldest of three daughters, Choi grew up in a wealthy family that operated a construction business that had connections with businesses in China, and her personal net worth was more than HK$100 million. Choi also engaged in philanthropy by co-founding Paomes Charitable Organisation, a group dedicated to help stray animals.

Investigations
After the murder of Choi came to light, the police first arrested three suspects on 25 February 2023. One of them was Choi's former brother-in-law Anthony Kwong Kong-kit (鄺港傑) who was her hired driver, while the other two were the first suspect's parents, who both used to be Choi's parents-in-law before she divorced her first husband Alex Kwong Kong-chi (鄺港智). Choi married Alex Kwong when she was 18 years old and had two children during their three-year long marriage before it ended with a divorce on an unknown date. Afterwards, Choi married her current husband Chris Tam, whose father is the founder of a restaurant chain Tamjai Yunnan Mixian(譚仔雲南米線), and she had two more children with Tam. Despite their divorce, Choi maintained a close relationship with her former husband and his kin.

After a citywide manhunt by police (with a reward amounting to approximately HK$2 million), Alex Kwong later became the fourth to be arrested after he unsuccessfully tried to escape Hong Kong by boat. It was alleged that the death of Choi was masterminded by her former father-in-law Kwong Kau (鄺球), a former policeman who was previously accused of rape. The motive was believed to be the result of a money dispute, and a luxury apartment believed to be bought by Choi before putting it under her former father-in-law's name. The luxury apartment is located in Kadoorie Hill in Kowloon Tong, one of Hong Kong’s most prestigious addresses, and the neighbourhood is home to some of the city’s wealthiest people.

On 26 February 2023, the police found Choi's severed head and several of her ribs inside a pot of cooked soup. At the same time, the police arrested a fifth suspect in connection to the killing, a 47-year-old Ng Chi Wing (伍志榮), a mistress of Kwong Kau. She was said to have helped hide Alex Kwong before his apparent attempt to flee Hong Kong. The search for the other missing hands and torso and other body parts remained ongoing. More than a hundred officers were mobilized to search for the other missing body parts. Currently, the police were searching through the North East New Territories Landfill in Ta Kwu Ling for the missing hands and torso. They are also currently questioning the villagers to seek more information needed to solve the case. DNA testing results revealed in March 2023 that the recovered head belonged to Choi.

On 27 February 2023, the police proceeded with murder charges against Alex Kwong, his brother and father, while charging Alex Kwong's mother with perverting the course of justice. All four suspects, who were officially charged in court, were denied bail and would be held in remand pending investigations. Their cases are adjourned to 8 May 2023. Ng was charged with abetting a murder suspect, but she is currently released on bail.

Not only that, it came to light that Alex Kwong was a suspect behind seven alleged cases of theft that occurred for nearly a decade before Choi was killed, and had once absconded despite being scheduled to appear in court in 2015. Hence, Kwong was charged in court for these cases as well. On 2 March 2023, a sixth suspect, 41-year-old Lam Shun (林舜) was arrested on suspicion of aiding and abetting Kwong to escape Hong Kong by boat for a payment sum of HK$300,000. Lam was an employee of a yacht rental company. Lam, who was charged on 6 March, was granted bail. A seventh suspect named Irene Pun Hau-yin (潘巧賢), a 29-year-old Hong Konger and friend of Alex Kwong, was also arrested in Shenzhen, China on 7 March for abetting Kwong in his attempted escape from Hong Kong, and she was handed over to the Hong Kong authorities. Pun was charged on 8 March, and later granted bail of HK$50,000, but she was given a travel ban to prevent her from leaving Hong Kong.

According to the laws of Hong Kong, a conviction for murder carries the mandatory sentence of life imprisonment. Originally, the death penalty was the sole legal punishment for murder in Hong Kong before it was fully abolished in 1993, allowing judges to instead impose life sentences as the permissible penalty for murder.

In another development of the case, Choi's mother filed a court injunction to forbid Kwong Kau from selling the property linked to her daughter's murder and to seek a declaration that her daughter was the beneficiary owner of that apartment.

Suspects
Alex Kwong Kong-chi (鄺港智), 28, Choi's former husband - charged with murder
Anthony Kwong Kong-kit (鄺港傑), 31, Alex Kwong's brother and Choi's former brother-in-law - charged with murder
Kwong Kau (鄺球), 65, Alex Kwong and Anthony Kwong's father, Choi's former father-in-law - charged with murder
Jenny Li Sui-heung (李瑞香), 63, Alex Kwong and Anthony Kwong's mother, Choi's former mother-in-law - charged with perverting the course of justice
Ng Chi Wing (伍志榮), 47, Kwong Kau's mistress - charged with assisting a murder suspect
Henry Lam Shun (林舜), 41, Alex Kwong's friend - charged with abetting a murder suspect
Irene Pun Hau-yin (潘巧賢), 29, abetting a murder suspect

Responses
The case of Choi's killing brought shock to the whole community of Hong Kong, as well as making headlines internationally. The high-profile nature of the crime has also brought to light several notorious murder cases that happened in the past, including serial killer Lam Kor-wan (whose original death sentence was commuted to life imprisonment), the Braemar Hill murders of 1985 (in which five youths were convicted of killing the two victims, with two being imprisoned indefinitely and three serving life sentences) and the Hello Kitty murder case of 1999 (where three persons were sentenced to imprisonment terms of between 18 years and life).

Hong Kong actor Aaron Kwok and his wife Moka Fang were reportedly devastated over the death of Choi, who was close friends with the couple, and they offered condolences, describing her as a good friend. Choi's current husband, with whom she had two children, remembered her as a wife and mother who was often attentive and caring for her family, and stated he would take care of the children, including his two step-children. Choi's father-in-law also regarded her as a daughter who was not his own but whom he doted on. Similarly, Choi's mother also made tributes to her eldest daughter and talked about the good memories she shared with her daughter, whom she described as filial. While thousands of fans and netizens worldwide offered condolences for the victim, some netizens from China stated that the perpetrators deserved the death penalty for murdering Choi, and were disappointed at the fact that it was not applicable in Hong Kong despite China's continued use of capital punishment for severe crimes. The school where Choi's children attended also stated that counseling sessions would be provided to her children and any other students affected by the horrific nature of the crime. The ritual to pay respects to Choi was held on 11 March 2023.

The community at Tai Po's Lung Mei Village, where most of Choi's dismembered body parts were recovered, also made plans to perform Taoist rituals to "calm the spirit" of the deceased, due to the horrific and tragic nature of her death. Choi's family members and friends gathered outside the crime scene to show respects.

The police also made a press conference, assuring the public that they would put in efforts to ensure that justice is fulfilled to the fullest for the victim and her family. They also stated that with the help of GPS records and CCTV footages, they were able to solve the case.

See also
List of solved missing person cases

Past notorious murder cases in Hong Kong 
Lam Kor-wan (1982)
Anne Anne Kindergarten stabbing (1982)
Braemar Hill murders (1985)
Lam Kwok-wai (1992)
Hello Kitty murder case (1999)
Murder of Robert Kissel (2003)
Murder of Glory Chau and Moon Siu (2013)
Murders of Sumarti Ningsih and Jesse Lorena (2014)

Similar crimes elsewhere involving dismembering of bodies 
 Black Dahlia, United States (1947)
 Death of Ayakannu Marithamuthu, Singapore (1984)
 Eight Immortals Restaurant murders, Portuguese Macau (1985)
 Mona Fandey, Malaysia (1993)
 John Martin Scripps, Singapore (1995)
 Nanjing University mutilation case, China (1996)
 Kallang River body parts murder, Singapore (2005)
 Murder of Shaariibuugiin Altantuyaa, Malaysia (2006)
 Murder of Jeffrey Howe, England (2009)
 Murder of Muhammad Noor, Singapore (2014)
 Murders of Joel and Lisa Guy, United States (2016)
 Assassination of Jamal Khashoggi, Turkey (2018)
 Killing of Keane Mulready-Woods, Ireland (2020)

References

2023 deaths
2023 in Hong Kong
2023 murders in Asia
2020s missing person cases
February 2023 events in China
Formerly missing people
Missing person cases in China
Murder in Hong Kong
People murdered in Hong Kong
Violence against women in Hong Kong